Kurunduwatta Grama Niladhari Division is a Grama Niladhari Division of the Thimbirigasyaya Divisional Secretariat of Colombo District of Western Province, Sri Lanka.

Colombo International School, Nelum Pokuna Mahinda Rajapaksa Theatre, Department of National Archives, Nondescripts Cricket Club Ground, Singhalese Sports Club Cricket Ground, National Institute of Business Management (Sri Lanka), Town Hall, Colombo, Cinnamon Gardens, National Museum of Natural History, Colombo and Independence Memorial Museum are located within, nearby or associated with Kurunduwatta.

Kurunduwatta is a surrounded by the Ibbanwala, Borella South, Milagiriya, Narahenpita, Bambalapitiya, Borella North, Kollupitiya, Kuppiyawatta West and Thimbirigasyaya Grama Niladhari Divisions.

Demographics

Ethnicity 

The Kurunduwatta Grama Niladhari Division has a Sinhalese majority (73.9%) and a significant Sri Lankan Tamil population (14.5%). In comparison, the Thimbirigasyaya Divisional Secretariat (which contains the Kurunduwatta Grama Niladhari Division) has a Sinhalese majority (52.8%), a significant Sri Lankan Tamil population (28.0%) and a significant Moor population (15.1%)

Religion 

The Kurunduwatta Grama Niladhari Division has a Buddhist majority (63.5%) and a significant Hindu population (12.7%). In comparison, the Thimbirigasyaya Divisional Secretariat (which contains the Kurunduwatta Grama Niladhari Division) has a Buddhist plurality (47.9%), a significant Hindu population (22.5%) and a significant Muslim population (17.4%)

Gallery

References 

Grama Niladhari Divisions of Thimbirigasyaya Divisional Secretariat